KBRX-FM (102.9 FM) is a radio station broadcasting a country music format. Licensed to O'Neill, Nebraska, United States, the station is currently owned by Ranchland Broadcasting Co., Inc. and features programming from ABC Radio.

References

External links

BRX-FM
Country radio stations in the United States
Radio stations established in 1973
1993 establishments in Nebraska